OAW may stand for:

 Helvetic Airways, a Swiss airline, ICAO code OAW
 Ostdeutsche Albatroswerke G.m.b.H, a subsidiary of Albatros Flugzeugwerke, World War I German aircraft manufacturer
 Austrian Academy of Sciences (Österreichische Akademie der Wissenschaften) (ÖAW)
 , a modular MDA/MDD generator framework implemented in Java
 Convention used in welding documentation for Oxy-acetylene welding